Sam Barnes (born 16 October 1991) is an English footballer who plays as a defender for Cymru Premier club Aberystwyth Town.

A former Liverpool schoolboys player, he first played for the Stockport County Under 18 team whilst still at school. His twin brother Louis Barnes was also part of the Under 18 side and was, along with Sam, given a squad number for the first team in the 2009/10 season.

In August 2010 both of the Barnes twins went on trial at Manchester United and played for United's reserve team in a pre-season 2–0 win over Altrincham.

They were released shortly afterwards after they failed to agree new contracts at Stockport County. In January 2011 he joined Northwich Victoria.

In February 2011 he joined Marine. After 43 appearances for the club, in June 2012 he went on to join division rivals Hednesford Town.

On 20 June 2020, Barnes joined Aberystwyth Town.

Career statistics

References

External links
 
 

1991 births
Living people
Footballers from Liverpool
English footballers
Association football defenders
Stockport County F.C. players
English Football League players
Northwich Victoria F.C. players
Marine F.C. players
Northern Premier League players
Twin sportspeople
English twins
Hednesford Town F.C. players
Glossop North End A.F.C. players
Association football midfielders
Aberystwyth Town F.C. players